Bobby Harden (born February 8, 1967) is a former professional American football player for the Miami Dolphins. He played defensive back for the University of Miami from 1985 to 1989 and won two National Championships. He was drafted by the Miami Dolphins in the 12th round of the 1990 NFL Draft and played 4 seasons for the Dolphins from 1990 to 1993.

References

Living people
1967 births
American football defensive backs
Miami Dolphins players
Miami Hurricanes football players
People from Pahokee, Florida
Players of American football from Florida
Sportspeople from the Miami metropolitan area
Piper High School (Florida) alumni